Jesse Reynolds (born 2 October 1996) is a New Zealand para-swimmer who represented his country at the 2016 Summer Paralympics, the 2018 Commonwealth Games and the 2020 Summer Paralympics. He also competed at the 2013 and 2015 IPC Swimming World Championships.

References

External links
 
 
 

1996 births
Living people
New Zealand male backstroke swimmers
Paralympic swimmers of New Zealand
S9-classified Paralympic swimmers
Swimmers at the 2016 Summer Paralympics
Swimmers at the 2018 Commonwealth Games
Swimmers at the 2020 Summer Paralympics
20th-century New Zealand people
21st-century New Zealand people
Commonwealth Games silver medallists for New Zealand
Swimmers at the 2022 Commonwealth Games
Commonwealth Games medallists in swimming
Medallists at the 2022 Commonwealth Games